Gary Burton Quartet in Concert is a live album by vibraphonist Gary Burton recorded in 1968 at Carnegie Hall and released by RCA. Burton’s quartet consists of guitarist Larry Coryell, bassist Steve Swallow and drummer Bob Moses.

Reception 
Scott Yanow of Allmusic stated: "The material (by Mike Gibbs, Burton, Coryell and Bob Dylan) is quite strong, and there are some hints of the avant-garde".

Track listing 
All compositions by Gary Burton, except where indicated.
 "Blue Comedy" (Mike Gibbs) – 9:02 
 "The Sunset Bell" – 5:17 
 "Lines" (Larry Coryell) – 3:06 
 "Walter L." – 6:36 
 "Wrong Is Right" (Coryell) – 6:14 
 "Dreams" – 5:49 
 "I Want You" (Bob Dylan) – 3:06 
 "One, Two, 1–2–3–4" (Burton, Coryell) – 10:45

Personnel 
 Gary Burton — vibraphone
 Larry Coryell — guitar
 Steve Swallow — double bass
 Bob Moses — drums

References

Further reading 
 

RCA Records live albums
Gary Burton live albums
1968 live albums
albums recorded at Carnegie Hall